Man of Violence is a 1969 British crime film co-written, produced and directed by Pete Walker and starring Michael Latimer, "Hammer glamour" actresses Virginia Wetherell and Luan Peters, and Derek Aylward. It is also known as Moon.

Plot
In the film, a young man is forced to work for a major criminal in his effort to find a hidden stash of stolen gold.

Cast
 Michael Latimer – Moon
 Luan Peters – Angel
 Derek Aylward – Nixon
 Maurice Kaufmann – Charles Grayson
 Derek Francis – Sam Bryant
 Kenneth Hendel – Hunt
 George Belbin – Burgess
 Sydney Conabere – Alex Powell
 Erika Raffael – Goose
 Virginia Wetherell – Gale
 Steve Emerson – Steve
 Peter Thornton – Mike
 Michael Balfour – Cafe owner
 John Keston – Girling
 Jessica Spencer – Joyce
 Mark Allington
 Sheila Babbage
 Patrick Jordan
 Andreas Malandrinos
 John Lawrence
 Stephen Zamit
 and The Wishful Thinking

Production

Filming locations
The film was shot on location in England and Tunisia.

Music
The music was composed and conducted by Cyril Ornadel who went on to compose four more films for Walker.

Release

Critical response
"Pete Walker's affectionate low-budget homage to the gangster thriller is packed with sights and sounds from a Britain about to swing out of the Sixties and into a somewhat less optimistic decade. Man of Violence offers not only rare glimpses of a world gone by but also some twists on generic convention."

Home media
The BFI have released Man of Violence on DVD and Blu-ray through its Flipside strand, together with the film The Big Switch.

References

External links
 
 

1969 films
1969 crime drama films
1960s crime thriller films
British crime drama films
British crime thriller films
Films directed by Pete Walker
1960s English-language films
1960s British films